Parastemon grandifructus is a tree in the family Chrysobalanaceae. The specific epithet  is from the Latin meaning "large fruit".

Description

Distribution and habitat
Parastemon grandifructus is endemic to Malaysian Borneo. Its habitat is lowland forests, including swamps, from sea-level to  altitude.

References

Chrysobalanaceae
Endemic flora of Borneo
Trees of Borneo
Plants described in 1987